Efraín Antonio Burgos   (born April 11, 1961) is a Salvadoran former professional footballer and current manager.

Since 2009 he works for the USSF in San Francisco as a coach. His son Efrain, Jr. is a professional footballer.

Club career
Chirolón Burgos started his professional career at Once Lobos and had spells at FAS with whom he won the 1981 league title, Atlético Marte, Isidro Metapán and Guatemalan club Cobán Imperial, before retiring with another league title win at Alianza in 1995.

Coaching career

FAS
In December 2013, Burgos signed as new coach of FAS, replacing Jaime de la Pava. With the team of Santa Ana, Burgos reached the semi-finals of the Clausura 2014, but was eliminated by Dragón. Days later Burgos left the team due to family reasons, being replaced by Agustín Castillo.

San Pablo Tacachico
In June 2015, Burgos signed as new coach of San Pablo Tacachico.

UES
Burgos signed with UES as coach for the rest of the Apertura 2015 tournament, replacing William Renderos Iraheta.

His debut was a 1–2 defeat against Chalatenango in the Estadio José Gregorio Martínez. His balance was five defeats, six ties and one victory. Burgos coached the scarlet team in the midst of a serious administrative, economic and sports crisis, suffering arrears in salary payments. Burgos was fired from UES after the end of the tournament, being replaced by Edgar Henríquez.

Atlético Marte
Burgos signed as coach with Atlético Marte for the rest of the Clausura 2016 tournament, replacing Juan Andrés Sarulyte. With Atlético Marte Burgos experienced a serious administrative, economic and sports crisis, arrears in salary payments and pressures from club directive.

At the end of the tournament Atlético Marte descended after a 1–4 defeat against Pasaquina, being in the 12th position in the league table with only 14 points, and 10 points from Sonsonate in the Aggregate Table.

Audaz
In June 2016 Burgos signed as new coach of Audaz. However, after only coached two games Burgos left the team.

Return to UES
Burgos signed again with UES for the rest of the Apertura 2016 and Clausura 2017, replacing Edgar Henríquez. His debut on his return was a 2–3 defeat against Sonsonate. His second stage with UES ended with the team's descent after a 1–0 victory against Pasaquina in the Estadio Universitario at the last game of the Clausura 2017. Again Burgos suffered in the scarlet team an administrative crisis and arrears in salary payments.

Dragón
Burgos signed with Dragón for the rest of the Apertura 2017 tournament, replacing Henry Vanegas. Dragón at that time was mired in an economic, institutional and sports crisis. Days later it was known that Burgos did not have a valid title to coach in Salvadoran Primera División and therefore could not be registered by Dragón.

Months later Burgos was fired from Dragón after a 2–2 draw against Sonsonate. Burgos was fired without having been registered as the team's main coach. The directive of Dragón, to avoid sanctions, relegated him to the position of Sports Director.

Burgos was replaced by Santos Rivera and Abel Blanco for the rest of the games.

International career
Burgos also played for El Salvador and has represented them 5 times in the 1980s.

References

1961 births
Living people
Sportspeople from Santa Ana, El Salvador
Association football midfielders
Salvadoran footballers
El Salvador international footballers
C.D. FAS footballers
C.D. Atlético Marte footballers
A.D. Isidro Metapán footballers
Alianza F.C. footballers
Expatriate footballers in Guatemala
Salvadoran football managers
Salvadoran emigrants to the United States
C.D. FAS managers